Lev Kovpak (born 23 October 1978, Pervouralsk, Sverdlovsk Oblast) is a Russian political figure and deputy of the 7th and 8th State Dumas. He is a distant relative of the Hero of the Soviet Union Sydir Kovpak.

Lev Kovpak studied in the US at the University of California, San Francisco. In the 1990s, he worked at the SKB-bank in Ekaterinburg. From 2005 to 2010, he was the deputy of the Ekaterinburg City Duma of the 4th convocation. In 2010–2011, he was the deputy of the Regional Duma of the bicameral Legislative Assembly of the Sverdlovsk Region. In 2016 he was elected deputy of the 7th State Duma from the Sverdlovsk oblast constituency. Since September 2021, he has served as the deputy of the 8th State Duma.

His father Igor is an entrepreneur, operating the Kirovsky supermarket chain in Sverdlovsk Region. The company is a major employer in the region and a regional government contractor. Lev was vice president of the company from 2002 till 2015, he is also its shareholder. According to the OCCRP report, Igor is the beneficiary of an offshore British Virgin Islands company with USD $56 million worth of assets. 

In July 2021, The Arbitration Court of the Sverdlovsk Region arrested the property of Lev Kovpak and his family. The decision was made as part of a bankruptcy case at the request of Konstantin Markov, acting bankruptcy trustee of the "Prodovolstvennaya Kompania", that tried to bring Kovpakov to subsidiary liability. The arrest was lifted at the end of August the same year.

In 2022, as a result of the 2022 Russian invasion of Ukraine, he was placed on a list of sanctioned Russian entities and people by the European Union, Ukraine, United Kingdom, Switzerland, Belgium and Japan. After that, the Czech Republic the froze bank account with USD $10.5 million owned by Lev's wife Veronika.

References

1978 births
Living people
United Russia politicians
21st-century Russian politicians
Seventh convocation members of the State Duma (Russian Federation)
Eighth convocation members of the State Duma (Russian Federation)
Russian individuals subject to European Union sanctions